Azwinndini Muronga is a Dean of Science at the Nelson Mandela University. He was previously a professor of Physics and Director of the Science Center at the University of Johannesburg. He matriculated at Mbilwi Secondary School. and then completed his Bachelor of Science in Physics at the University of Venda, a BSc(Honours) and a Master of Science at the University of Cape Town as well as a PhD in Physics from the University of Minnesota. He was previously President of the South African Institute of Physics.  He has made seminal contribution to causal second order viscous relativistic fluid dynamics.

References 

Academic staff of Nelson Mandela University
Living people
University of Cape Town alumni
University of Minnesota College of Science and Engineering alumni
Academic staff of the University of Johannesburg
Year of birth missing (living people)